The Timken Building is an historic building, completed in 1894, in San Diego's Gaslamp Quarter, in the U.S. state of California.

See also
 List of Gaslamp Quarter historic buildings

References

External links

 

Buildings and structures completed in 1894
Buildings and structures in San Diego
Gaslamp Quarter, San Diego